The 2007 South American Under-17 Football Championship was played in Ecuador from 4 to 25 March 2007. The seven venues of the competition were the cities of Ambato, Azogues, Cuenca, Ibarra, Latacunga, Quito and Riobamba. The tournament provided four berths to the 2007 FIFA U-17 World Cup and six to the 2007 Pan American Games.

Squads

First round
The ten national teams were divided in two groups of five teams each. The top three teams in each group qualified for the final round and for the 2007 Pan American Games.

Group A

Group B

Final round
The final round was played in a round robin system, with the top four teams qualifying for the 2007 U-17 World Cup.

Topscorers

12 goals
 Lulinha
7 goals
 Fábio
6 goals
 Cristian Nazarith

3 goals
 Nicolás Mazzola
 Eduardo Salvio
 James Rodríguez
 Ángel Marín
 Christian La Torre
 Reimond Manco
 Santiago Silva
 Yonatan Del Valle

2 goals
 Santiago Fernández
 Diego Suárez
 Alex Teixeira
 Bernardo
 Fellipe Bastos
 Maicon
 Danilo Bustos
 Ricardo Serna

2 goals (cont.)
 Santiago Tréllez
 Miller Bolaños
 Pablo Ochoa
 Erick Minda
 Jairo Hernández
 Jonathan Urretavizcaya
 Gustavo Páez

Qualified for 2007 U-17 World Cup

Qualified for 2007 Pan American Games

 (declined, replaced by )

External links
CONMEBOL official website

South American Under-17 Football Championship
Under
International association football competitions hosted by Ecuador
2007 in Ecuadorian football
2007 in youth association football